Francis Henry Durbridge (25 November 1912 – 11 April 1998) was an English dramatist and author, best known for the creation of the character Paul Temple, the gentlemanly detective who appeared in 16 BBC multi-part radio serials from 1938 onward.

Biography

Durbridge was born in Hull, East Riding of Yorkshire, and educated at Bradford Grammar School, where he was encouraged to write by his English teacher. He continued to do so while studying English at the University of Birmingham. After graduating in 1933, he worked for a short time as a stockbroker's clerk before selling a radio play, Promotion, to the BBC at the age of 21.

Durbridge created the character of Paul Temple, a crime novelist and detective, in the 1930s. With Steve Trent, a Fleet Street journalist who would later become his wife, Temple solved numerous crimes in the glamorous world of the leisured middle classes, at first on radio. In addition to the Paul Temple series, Durbridge wrote other mysteries for radio and television, many of which were also produced for Dutch, German and Italian television and radio.

Durbridge also forged a successful career as a writer for the stage with seven plays, the last of which, Sweet Revenge, was written in 1991. He also wrote forty-three novels, many of which were adapted from his scripts, sometimes with the help of others.

Work for radio

Paul Temple in the United Kingdom
Durbridge wrote twenty Paul Temple serials for radio. The first was Send for Paul Temple, broadcast in eight episodes on the BBC Midland Regional Programme from 8 April 1938. Hugh Morton played Paul, and Steve was played by Bernadette Hodgson. Carl Bernard took over the part of Paul in 1939. Peter Coke took over the part from the 1954 serial, Paul Temple and the Gilbert Case, onwards.

Marjorie Westbury took over the part of Steve from the fifth serial, Send for Paul Temple Again (1945). She remained as Steve for the rest of the radio run. To many people, Coke and Westbury are most firmly identified with Paul and Steve.

The original signature tune was taken from Scheherazade by Rimsky-Korsakov, with incidental music taken from the works of other composers, including Tintagel by Sir Arnold Bax. The signature tune was later changed to Coronation Scot by Vivian Ellis. The BBC licensed the serials to broadcasters in Commonwealth countries, where they were transmitted long after their original runs in the UK.

Paul Temple in Germany
In the 1960s, German radio adapted twelve Paul Temple serials. Like the BBC originals, each part ended with a cliffhanger, making them Strassenfeger ("street-clearers"), which were so popular as to leave the streets deserted. The actors were of national renown, with Paul Temple played by Luxembourg-born René Deltgen, and supported by Gustav Knuth, Paul Klinger and others. All of these German radio serials are, like the BBC originals, available on CD.

The European Broadcasting Union invited Durbridge in 1967 to write an original radio serial for the international market, La Boutique. This was broadcast in more than fifteen countries.

Work for television
Between 1952 and 1980, Durbridge wrote 17 TV serials for the BBC. Until 1959, they were shown under the umbrella title A Francis Durbridge Serial, which was then changed to Francis Durbridge Presents. Versions were also made in the Netherlands, Italy, France and Germany, some serials were re-made in the 1980s and 1990s.

The Scarf was a six-part serial starring Stephen Murray and Donald Pleasence, and was aired by the BBC in February and March 1959. The theme music was The Girl from Corsica by Trevor Duncan. There were objections in Germany in 1962 when comedian Wolfgang Neuss revealed in a newspaper who would turn out to be the murderer in the last episode of a German version called .

In 1960–61, The World of Tim Frazer was broadcast as an 18-episode serial featuring three adventures  with Jack Hedley in the title role. They attracted almost 80% of all TV viewers—partly because, at that time, many European countries had one TV station each.

In the sixties and seventies, many mini-series adapted from Durbridge's works were produced in Italy by RAI-TV. They featured some of the best Italian actors, among them Aroldo Tieri, Giuliana Lojodice, Nando Gazzolo, Ugo Pagliai, Luigi Vannucchi, Alberto Lupo and Rossano Brazzi. In France, TV scriptwriter and director Abder Isker produced some of Durbridge's adaptations for ORTF.

In the mid-1960s, mini-series based on the Paul Temple novels appeared on TV in Europe.

The 1969–1971 television series Paul Temple ran for 52 episodes over four seasons, with the last 39 episodes (seasons 2–4) being the first international television co-production, made by the BBC with Taurus Films of Munich, West Germany. Paul Temple was played by British actor Francis Matthews, with Ros Drinkwater playing Steve.

Novels
Durbridge wrote many Paul Temple novels, but mostly worked with a co-author because he regarded himself as a writer of dialogue, a scriptwriter rather than a novelist. The first was Send for Paul Temple (1938), written in collaboration with the pseudonymous John Thewes. He is thought to have been Charles Hatton, with whom Durbridge collaborated on the following four Temple novelisations up until 1948. All of these were rapidly adapted from Durbridge's original radio scripts in order to capitalise on the popularity of the radio serial. Publicity for Send for Paul Temple described it as "the novel of the thriller that created a BBC fan-mail record".

The two novels with Douglas Rutherford (The Tyler Mystery, 1957 and East of Algiers, 1959) appeared under the Paul Temple pen name. The Tyler Mystery is unusual in giving Temple's wife Steve a more central role. East of Algiers was partly based on the 1947 radio serial Paul Temple and the Sullivan Mystery. From The Kelby Affair (1970) on the novels are credited to Francis Durbridge alone.

Durbridge wrote three Tim Frazer novels: The World of Tim Frazer (1962), Tim Frazer Again (1964) and Tim Frazer Gets the Message (1978). Beware of Johnny Washington (1951, reissued by HarperCollins in 2017) was a substantially re-written version of the first Paul Temple novel, Send for Paul Temple and there were three others based on Paul Temple scripts that were recycled as non-Temple books. Two titles, Back Room Girl (1950) and The Pig-Tail Murder (1969) were written as original novels, but most of the later books were adapted from the television plays of the 1960s and 1970s.

Personal life
Durbridge married Norah Lawley in 1940. They had two sons. He died at his home in Barnes, London, aged 85, in 1998.

List of radio plays and serials
The dates given are those of the first broadcast (and, in the case of serials, of the first episode):

Paul Temple
Send for Paul Temple – 8 April 1938
Paul Temple and the Front Page Men – 2 November 1938
News of Paul Temple – 13 November 1939
Paul Temple Intervenes – 30 October 1942
Send for Paul Temple Again – 13 September 1945
A Case for Paul Temple – 7 February 1946
Paul Temple and the Gregory Affair – 17 October 1946
Paul Temple and Steve – 30 March 1947
Mr and Mrs Paul Temple – 21 November 1947
Paul Temple and the Sullivan Mystery – 1 December 1947
Paul Temple and the Curzon Case – 7 December 1948
Paul Temple and the Madison Mystery – 12 October 1949
Paul Temple and the Vandyke Affair – 3 November 1950
Paul Temple and the Jonathan Mystery – 10 May 1951
Paul Temple and Steve Again – 8 April 1953
Paul Temple and the Gilbert Case – 2 April 1954
Paul Temple and the Madison Mystery – 20 June 1955 (new production)
Paul Temple and the Lawrence Affair – 11 April 1956
Paul Temple and the Spencer Affair – 13 November 1957
Paul Temple and the Vandyke Affair – 1 January 1959 (new production)
Paul Temple and the Conrad Case – 2 March 1959
Paul Temple and the Gilbert Case – 22 November 1959 (new production)
Paul Temple and the Margo Mystery – 1 January 1961
Paul Temple and the Jonathan Mystery – 14 October 1963 (new production)
Paul Temple and the Geneva Mystery – 11 April 1965
Paul Temple and the Alex Affair – 26 February 1968 (revised version of Send For Paul Temple Again)
Paul Temple and the Sullivan Mystery – 7 August 2006 (new production)

Other radio plays and serials
Promotion – 3 October 1934
Information Received – 25 February 1938
We Were Strangers – 9 July 1940
And Anthony Sherwood Laughed  –  20 December 1940
Mr Hartington Died Tomorrow § – 9 February 1942
The Essential Heart ‡ – 6 February 1943
Farewell Leicester Square §  – 8 February 1943
Over My Dead Body – 11 April 1945
John Washington Esquire – 16 September 1949
What Do You Think? – 12 September 1962
La Boutique – 2 October 1967
§ as Lewis Middleton Harvey
‡ as Nicholas Vane

List of British TV series
None of the episodes of The Francis Durbridge Serial are believed to have survived. All episodes of Francis Durbridge Presents survive except for The World of Tim Frazer of which only episode 3 and 10 (out of 18) are thought to still exist.
A Francis Durbridge Serial
The Broken Horseshoe (1952)
Operation Diplomat (1952)
The Teckman Biography (1953–54)
Portrait of Alison (1955)
My Friend Charles (1956)
The Other Man (1956)
A Time of Day (1957)
The Scarf (1959)
Francis Durbridge Presents
The World of Tim Frazer (1960–61)
The Desperate People (1963)
Melissa (1964)
A Man Called Harry Brent (1965)
A Game of Murder (1966)
Bat Out of Hell (1966)
Paul Temple (52 episodes) (1969–71)
Francis Durbridge Presents
The Passenger (1971)
Melissa (1974)
The Doll (1975)
Breakaway – The Family Affair (1980)
Breakaway – The Local Affair (1980)

In 1997, Channel 4 broadcast a version of Melissa, adapted by Alan Bleasdale from the Francis Durbridge novel. Jennifer Ehle played Melissa.

List of German TV adaptations
Der Andere (1959, based on The Other Man)
Es ist soweit (1960, based on A Time Of Day)
 (1962, based on The Scarf)
 (1963, based on The World of Tim Frazer)
 (1964, based on Tim Frazer: The Salinger Affair)
 (1965, based on The Desperate People)
 (1966, based on Melissa)
 (1968, based on A Man Called Harry Brent)
 (1970, based on Bat Out of Hell), with Paul Hubschmid
 (1971, loosely based on Tim Frazer: The Mellin Forrest Mystery), with Hardy Krüger
 (1977, based on A Game Of Murder)

List of Italian TV adaptations
 (1963, based on The Scarf)
 (1964, based on A Time of Day), with Massimo Girotti
 (1966, based on Melissa), with Rossano Brazzi
 (1969, based on A Game of Murder)
 (1970, based on A Man Called Harry Brent)
 (1971, based on Bat Out of Hell)
 (1973, based on The Other Man)
 (1976, based on the stageplay Suddenly at Home), with Nino Castelnuovo
 (1976, based on The Doll), with Marilù Tolo
 (1977, based on The World of Tim Frazer)
 (1980, based on the stageplay The Gentle Hook)

List of French TV adaptations
L'Écharpe (1966, based on The Scarf), with Raymond Pellegrin
Mélissa (1968, based on Melissa)
À corps perdu (1970, based on Bat Out of Hell), with Danièle Delorme
 (1972, based on A Game Of Murder), with Marie-France Pisier
Un certain Richard Dorian (1973, based on A Man Called Harry Brent)
La Passagère (1974, based on The Passenger)
La Mort d'un touriste (1975, based on Tim Frazer: The Salinger Affair)

List of Polish TV adaptations
Szal (1970, based on The Scarf)
Melissa (1970, based on Melissa)
W biały dzień (1971, based on A Time Of Day)
Harry Brent (1972, based on A Man Called Harry Brent)
Jak błyskawica (1972, based on Bat Out of Hell)
Desperaci (1974, based on The Desperate People)
Brutalna gra (1976, based on A Game of Murder)
Odwet (1985, based on Murder With Love)

Other TV adaptations
Sweden
 (1962, based on The Scarf)
Finland
Huivi (1962, based on The Scarf)
Netherlands
Paul Vlaanderen

List of plays
Suddenly at Home (1971)
The Gentle Hook (1974)
House Guest (1976)
Murder With Love (1976)
Deadly Nightcap (1983)
A Touch of Danger (1987)
The Small Hours (1991)
Sweet Revenge (1993)
Fatal Encounter (2002-posthumous)

List of films
 1946 Send for Paul Temple (with Anthony Hulme as Paul Temple)
 1948 Calling Paul Temple (based upon Send for Paul Temple Again, with John Bentley as Paul Temple)
 1950 Paul Temple's Triumph (based upon News of Paul Temple, with John Bentley as Paul Temple)
 1952 Paul Temple Returns (based upon Paul Temple Intervenes, with John Bentley as Paul Temple)
 1953 The Broken Horseshoe (based on the 1952 BBC TV series)
 1953 Operation Diplomat (based on the 1952 BBC TV series)
 1954 The Teckman Mystery (based upon The Teckman Biography)
 1955 Portrait of Alison (U.S. title: Postmark for Danger) (based upon Portrait of Alison)
 1957 The Vicious Circle (based upon My Friend Charles)
 1964  / Case 33: Antwerp is an Austrian/Belgian co-production based on the Tim Frazer character

List of novels

Paul Temple novels
Send for Paul Temple (1938) (with John Thewes, aka Charles Hatton?)
Paul Temple and the Front Page Men (1939) (with Charles Hatton)
News of Paul Temple (1940) (with Charles Hatton)
Paul Temple Intervenes (1944) (with Charles Hatton)
Send for Paul Temple Again!  (1948) (with Charles Hatton)
The Tyler Mystery (1957) by 'Paul Temple' (with Douglas Rutherford)
East of Algiers (1959) by 'Paul Temple' (with Douglas Rutherford)
Paul Temple and the Kelby Affair (1970)
Paul Temple and the Harkdale Robbery (1970)
The Geneva Mystery (1971)
The Curzon Case (1971)
Paul Temple and the Margo Mystery (1986)
Paul Temple and the Madison Case (1988)

Tim Frazer novels
The World of Tim Frazer  (1962)
Tim Frazer Again  (1964)
Tim Frazer Gets the Message  (1978)

Other novels
Back Room Girl  (1950)
Beware of Johnny Washington (1951) (a re-writing of Send for Paul Temple)
Design for Murder  (1951) (based on Paul Temple and the Gregory Affair, 1946)
The Other Man  (1958)
A Time of Day  (1959)
The Scarf  (1960)
Portrait of Alison  (1962)
My Friend Charles  (1963)
Another Woman's Shoes  (1965) (based on Paul Temple and the Gilbert Case, 1954)
The Desperate People  (1966)
Dead to the World  (1967) (based on Paul Temple and the Jonathan Mystery, 1951, 1963)
My Wife Melissa  (1967)
The Pig-Tail Murder  (1969)
A Man Called Harry Brent  (1970)
Bat out of Hell  (1972)
A Game of Murder  (1975)
The Passenger  (1977)
Breakaway  (1981)
The Doll  (1982)

References

External links
 
The Francis Durbridge Homepage (German)
 The Paul Temple File

1912 births
1998 deaths
Alumni of the University of Birmingham
English crime fiction writers
English dramatists and playwrights
People educated at Bradford Grammar School
Writers from Kingston upon Hull
20th-century English novelists
20th-century British dramatists and playwrights
British male dramatists and playwrights
English male novelists
20th-century English male writers
Scriptwriters of Sexton Blake